Matyari or Matiari is a city located in Sindh, Pakistan. Matiari is also the district headquarter of Matiari District.

The Dargah of Pir Sayed sakhi Hashim Shah badshah, Hazrat Shah Abdul Latif Bhittai, Makhdoom Sarwar Nooh and Sardar Ahmed Shah Lakiari are located in Matiari distract.

Matiari has three talukas, they are Matiari, Hala and Saeedabad respectively.

Matiari is known for its ice-Cream and Ajrak (a Sindhi dressing).Its City Hala is famous for Handicraft such as Ajrak, Kashi, Jandi and embroidery.

Etymology 
Matiari word is derived from two Sindhi words Mat and yari, which means friendship with earthen water pots.

G.M Syed states regarding origin of the word Matiari:Sometime back a pious man who was entirely given to the worship of God, used to serve travelers who came for a drink, for which, purpose he kept a pitcher full of water. For this reason this village known "Mat Waru Goth" (The Village of the Pitcher) later came to be known Matyari.

References

Populated places in Sindh
Matiari District